The Metropole Cafe was a jazz club that operated in New York from the mid-1950s through 1965. Located at 7th Avenue and 48th Street, it was primarily noted in the bebop and progressive jazz era as being a venue for traditional musicians. Henry "Red" Allen, a New Orleans veteran of many bands including King Oliver's and Fletcher Henderson's, led the house band there beginning in 1954.

The Metropole featured jazz performances in the afternoon and evening. Its bandstand was a long runway behind the bar, which proved convenient when the club later abandoned jazz to feature strippers. Noted songwriters Jim Holvay and Gary Beisbier (who penned hit songs for the Buckinghams in the late 1960s) were part of a R & B band called The Chicagoans that played the Metropole Cafe in the fall of 1963. 

In 1968 the Metrolpole was home to a variety of Rock bands. Featured would be two bands per period, a two-week stint in most cases. The bands would alternate sets, each on stage for an hour, over a 12-hour stretch from 4 p.m. to 4 a.m. During their individual sets, go-go dancers, wearing skimpy bikini outfits, would be stationed across the runway stage behind the bar, which was usually frequented by older men who might wander into the club throughout the day and night.

Other resident performers at the club included Roy Eldridge, Coleman Hawkins, Cozy Cole, Charlie Shavers, Zutty Singleton, Claude Hopkins, J. C. Higginbotham, Tony Scott, Max Kaminsky, Sol Yaged, Maynard Ferguson (in 1964) and Buster Bailey. 
The last jazz acts to play the club before it ended its jazz policy in June 1965 were Gene Krupa and Mongo Santamaria.

In the film version of Neil Simon's The Odd Couple, Felix Ungar stops by the Metropole after a suicide attempt at the beginning of the film.

References

Interview with jazz bassist and historian Bill Crow.

Jazz clubs in New York City
1950s establishments in New York City
1965 disestablishments in New York (state)
Defunct jazz clubs in New York City